Jean Gabriel Fortuné (died 14 August 2021) was a Haitian politician, who served as the mayor of Les Cayes and senator. He was also a National Palace advisor and departmental delegate. In 2019, he delivered the offer of a conditional resignation by Haiti's president, Jovenel Moïse.

In 1995, he was wounded during political unrest in Haiti's capital, Port-au-Prince.

In 2008, when he was a senator, people protesting food prices stormed his home. In 2016, as a mayoral candidate, he pledged to replace all the latrines in Les Cayes with flush toilets. In 2016, he criticized the speed of the central government's hurricane response after a police clash with protesters caused the death of a boy in Les Cayes.

He announced his resignation as mayor in 2018 stating that protests had endangered his family. His resignation was refused 100 days later.

Fortuné died during the earthquake that struck Haiti on 14 August 2021. He was at a hotel during that time, which collapsed during the quake. Rescuers found him dead under the rubble hours later.

References

2021 deaths
21st-century Haitian politicians
Year of birth missing
Place of birth missing
People from Les Cayes
Mayors of places in Haiti
Members of the Senate (Haiti)
Deaths in earthquakes
Natural disaster deaths in Haiti